Handeni is a town located in the Handeni Urban District, Tanga Region, Tanzania. It is the capital of both Handeni Town Council and Handeni District. The 2012 national census estimated the population of Handeni Town Council at 79,056.

Transport
A paved secondary road connects Handeni with Korogwe in the northeast and Mkata in the southeast; both Korogwe and Mkata are on the T2 Trunk road from Dar es Salaam to Arusha.

References

Populated places in Tanga Region